The Chevrolet Series AB National (or Chevrolet National) is an American vehicle manufactured by Chevrolet in 1928 to replace the 1927 Series AA Capitol. Documented production numbers show that 1,193,212 Series ABs were manufactured in a variety of body styles with 69,217 originating from the Oshawa factory alone. Chevrolet instituted serial number recorded on the front seat heel board on either the left or right side, using the listed numbers to designate the point of origin of the vehicle identified.

The Series AB National was joined in the marketplace with another alternative to the Ford Model A called the Plymouth Model Q.

Specification

The updated look was one of the first projects from GM's Art & Colour studio. It was the last Chevrolet to use a four-cylinder engine until 1961 and the Chevrolet Chevy II / Nova. Roadsters and touring sedans had the ability to fold the windshield forward on top of the cowl for open air driving.

The Series AB was powered by Chevrolet's old  four-cylinder engine, but with minor modifications to produce  at 2,200 rpm. Four-wheel braking was also now provided. Fisher Body provided eight different coachwork choices to include both open and closed body styles. The top choice was listed as the Imperial Landau listed at US$715 ($ in  dollars ).  In May of 1925 the Chevrolet Export Boxing plant at Bloomfield, New Jersey was repurposed from a previous owner where Knock-down kits for Chevrolet, Oakland, Oldsmobile, Buick and Cadillac passenger cars, and both Chevrolet and G. M. C. truck parts are crated and shipped by railroad to the docks at Weehawken, New Jersey for overseas GM assembly factories.

See also
1928 Cadillac Series 314
1928 LaSalle Series 303
1928 Oldsmobile Model 30
1928 Buick Master Six
1928 Buick Standard Six
1928 Pontiac Six

References

Series AB National
Series AB National
Cars introduced in 1928
Vehicles introduced in 1928